N-Acetylmescaline is a mescaline derivative found in trace quantities in peyote (Lophophora williamsii).  It is a metabolite of mescaline in humans, but it has little pharmacological effects of its own.  At doses of up to 750 mg, only mild drowsiness was observed.

N-Acetylmescaline has microtubule assembly inhibitory activity.

References

Phenethylamine alkaloids
Acetamides